Trillium Lake is a lake situated  south-southwest of Mount Hood in the U.S. state of Oregon.  It is formed by a dam at the headwaters of Mud Creek, tributary to the Salmon River.  It was created by the state Department of Fish and Wildlife in 1960.

The area which is now the lake was part of the Barlow Road, a component of the Oregon Trail.  A log road across marshes allowed immigrants to pass to Summit Meadow, which was a toll station 1866—1870. Trillium is a genus of flowers particularly noticeable in the area.

The lake is popular for fishing, camping and photography, often clearly reflecting Mount Hood. Adjacent Trillium Lake Campground is administered by the Zigzag Ranger District of the Mount Hood National Forest. The large campground features a seasonal boat ramp and wheelchair-accessible floating dock. The lake is a very popular Nordic skiing destination from a trailhead across U.S. Route 26 from Snow Bunny. Some resources note its popularity on afternoons and weekends.

See also
 List of lakes in Oregon

References

Reservoirs in Oregon
Mount Hood
Lakes of Clackamas County, Oregon
Mount Hood National Forest
Protected areas of Clackamas County, Oregon